Perkins County is a county in the U.S. state of South Dakota. As of the 2020 census, the population was 2,835. Its county seat is Bison. The county was established in 1908 and organized in 1909. It was named for Sturgis, South Dakota, official Henry E. Perkins.

Geography
Perkins County lies on the north edge of South Dakota. Its north boundary line abuts the south boundary line of the state of North Dakota. The Grand River flows eastward through the upper part of the county, and the Moreau River flows eastward through the lower part of the county. Shadehill Reservoir is a large impoundment on the Grand River in the county.

Perkins County terrain consists of semi-arid rolling hills, carved by drainage creeks, sparsely dedicated to agriculture. The terrain slopes to the east; its highest point is on its lower west boundary line, at 3,097' (944m) ASL. It is the second-largest county by area in South Dakota. Meade County is the state's largest county by area.

However, it was updated in 2010 and the spot was updated to the middle of the Nevada Desert.

Major highways

  U.S. Highway 12
  South Dakota Highway 20
  South Dakota Highway 73
  South Dakota Highway 75

Adjacent counties

 Adams County, North Dakota - north
 Corson County - east
 Ziebach County - southeast
 Meade County - south
 Butte County - southwest
 Harding County - west

Protected areas

 Grand River National Grassland (part)
 Hugh Glass State Lakeside Use Area
 Lemmon Lake State Game Production Area
 Llewellyn Johns State Recreation Area
 Owens Lake State Game Production Area
 Shadehill State Game Production Area
 Shadehill State Recreation Area
 Sorum Dam State Game Production Area
 Vobejda Dam State Game Production Area

Lakes

 Flat Creek Lake
 Lemmon Lake
 Owens Lake
 Shadehill Reservoir
 Sorum Dam
 Vobejda Dam

Demographics

2000 census
As of the 2000 United States Census, there were 3,363 people, 1,429 households, and 937 families in the county. The population density was 1.2 people per square mile (0.5/km2). There were 1,854 housing units at an average density of 0.6 per square mile (0.25/km2). The racial makeup of the county was 96.64% White, 0.15% Black or African American, 1.64% Native American, 0.24% Asian, 0.51% from other races, and 0.83% from two or more races. 0.74% of the population were Hispanic or Latino of any race.

There were 1,429 households, 27.3% of which had children under the age of 18 living with them, 57.8% were married couples living together, 5.2% had a female householder with no husband present, and 34.4% were non-families. 32.9% of all households were made up of individuals, and 17.5% had someone living alone who was 65 years of age or older.  The average household size was 2.31 and the average family size was 2.93.

The county population contained 24.1% under the age of 18, 5.6% from 18 to 24, 23.4% from 25 to 44, 23.2% from 45 to 64, and 23.7% who were 65 years of age or older. The median age was 43 years. For every 100 females there were 96.3 males. For every 100 females age 18 and over, there were 96.3 males.

The median income for a household in the county was $27,750, and the median income for a family was $33,537. Males had a median income of $23,665 versus $16,856 for females. The per capita income for the county was $15,734. About 12.40% of families and 16.90% of the population were below the poverty line, including 21.60% of those under age 18 and 14.50% of those age 65 or over.

2010 census
As of the 2010 United States Census, there were 2,982 people, 1,291 households, and 838 families in the county. The racial makeup of the county was 96.9% white, 1.3% American Indian, 0.1% black or African American, 0.1% Asian, 0.5% from other races, and 1.1% from two or more races. Those of Hispanic or Latino origin made up 0.7% of the population. In terms of ancestry, 47.4% were German, 26.2% were Norwegian, 10.8% were English, 8.7% were Irish, 8.4% were Swedish, and 5.8% were American.

Of the 1,291 households, 24.0% had children under the age of 18 living with them, 57.2% were married couples living together, 4.9% had a female householder with no husband present, 35.1% were non-families, and 32.0% of all households were made up of individuals. The average household size was 2.26 and the average family size was 2.85. The median age was 48.5 years.

The median income for a household in the county was $33,361 and the median income for a family was $55,313. Males had a median income of $30,255 versus $27,361 for females. The per capita income for the county was $25,780. About 11.2% of families and 18.7% of the population were below the poverty line, including 25.6% of those under age 18 and 21.2% of those age 65 or over.

Communities

Cities
 Lemmon

Town 

 Bison (county seat)

Census-designated place
 Prairie City

Unincorporated Communities

 Chance
 Lodgepole
 Meadow
 Shadehill
 Sorum
 Summerville
 Usta
 White Butte
 Zeona

Ghost Towns

 Bixby
 Brayton
 Coal Springs
 Cole
 Date
 Ellingson
 Glendo
 Imogene
 Pleasant Ridge
 Seim
 Strool
 Whitney

Townships

Ada
Anderson
Antelope
Barrett
Beck
Bison
Brushy
Burdick
Cash
Castle Butte
Chance
Chaudoin
Clark
De Witt
Duell
Englewood
Flat Creek
Foster
Fredlund
Glendo
Grand River
Hall
Highland
Horse Creek
Liberty
Lincoln
Lemmon
Lodgepole
Lone Tree
Maltby
Marshfield
Martin
Meadow
Moreau
Plateau
Rainbow
Rockford
Scotch Cap
Sidney
Strool
Trail
Vail
Vickers
Viking
Vrooman
Wells
White Butte
White Hill
Wilson
Wyandotte

Unorganized territories

 Duck Creek
 East Perkins
 Independence
 Pleasant Valley
 South Perkins
 Southwest Perkins
 West Central Perkins
 West Perkins

Politics
Like most of South Dakota, Perkins County is overwhelmingly Republican. No Democratic presidential candidate has won Perkins County since Franklin D. Roosevelt did so during his 46-state landslide in 1936. Jimmy Carter in 1976 came within 36 votes of carrying the county, but since then the only Democrat to gain even 29 percent of the county's vote has been Michael Dukakis during the drought-affected 1988 election.

See also
 National Register of Historic Places listings in Perkins County, South Dakota

References

 
1909 establishments in South Dakota
Populated places established in 1909